Jimena López Fuentes (born 30 January 1999) is a Mexican professional footballer who plays as a left back for OL Reign of the American National Women's Soccer League (NWSL), as well as the Mexico women's national team.

Club career
On 14 January 2021, López was selected in the third round (28th overall) of the 2021 NWSL Draft by OL Reign. However, on 26 January 2021 she elected to sign with Spanish Primera División club Eibar.

International career
López represented Mexico at the 2014 Summer Youth Olympics, the 2016 CONCACAF Women's U-17 Championship, the 2016 FIFA U-17 Women's World Cup, the 2018 CONCACAF Women's U-20 Championship and the 2018 FIFA U-20 Women's World Cup. She made her senior debut on 27 February 2019 in a friendly match against Italy.

International goals
Scores and results list Mexico's goal tally first.

Honors
 with OL Reign
 NWSL Shield: 2022
 The Women's Cup: 2022

References

External links
 

1999 births
Living people
Footballers from Mexico City
Mexican women's footballers
Women's association football fullbacks
Texas A&M Aggies women's soccer players
OL Reign draft picks
SD Eibar Femenino players
Footballers at the 2014 Summer Youth Olympics
Mexico women's international footballers
Pan American Games competitors for Mexico
Footballers at the 2019 Pan American Games
Mexican expatriate footballers
Mexican expatriate sportspeople in the United States
Expatriate women's soccer players in the United States
Mexican expatriate sportspeople in Spain
Expatriate women's footballers in Spain
OL Reign players
National Women's Soccer League players
Mexican footballers